is a 1980 Japanese science fiction anime film and the fourth film (third theatrical) based on the classic anime series Space Battleship Yamato (known as Star Blazers in the United States).  The film is unique for switching from monaural VistaVision (1.85:1) to Quadraphonic CinemaScope (2.35:1) when the Yamato enters the Double Galaxy.

Plot

The Black Nebula Empire, last seen in Yamato: The New Voyage, lands a huge fortress on Earth and sends out an invasion force, while the Black Nebulan fleet wipes out Earth's space fleets. The fortress contains a bomb capable of destroying half the planet. The Nebulans threaten to use it if they are attacked.

The Yamato reaches the other side of the Black Nebula and finds a grand, white galaxy, similar to the Milky Way. They follow a beacon signal to a planet that looks just like Earth. They land, and are greeted by an apparently human woman, Sada, and two officers from the Black Nebulan Empire. They meet the Emperor, Scaldart, who also appears to be a human. He tells them that they are actually back in the Milky Way, in the year 2402. The vortex was a hole in time. The Earth has been under Black Nebulan rule for 200 years, and he is the (puppet) governor. Scaldart shows Kodai and the landing party all sorts of collections of Earth's famous artwork, and, up on the Yamato, the video screen scans the surface of the planet to find all of Earth's famous landmarks.

Scaldart shows them a time viewing machine which shows the history of the Yamato from 2199 up until the present. Then he shows them the future. The Yamato, orbiting the Earth, is destroyed by the enemy's flagship, the Grodaze, in 2402.

The landing crew returns, demoralized, to the Yamato... except for Sasha who seems to know her true destiny. She abandons the party and remains on conquered Earth. while alone on the surface, her mother Starsha appears in a vision. She tells Sasha that she was born between Iscandar and Earth, and that her destiny is to die far from both, in service of both.

Sasha manages to survive the incineration of the surface by escaping to the planet's lower levels. She finds a control center and sends a message to the Yamato, telling them that to destroy Dezarium, they must travel to the core through a huge conduit she is about to open. Scaldart announces after her message that if the Yamato proceeds any further, he will detonate the hyperon bomb on Earth.

The blast sets off an explosive chain reaction. The Yamato does a 180-degree turn and rushes out of the internal chamber, going to emergency warp when it reaches the conduit exit. Dezarium explodes behind them, destroying the delicate gravitational balance between the two sides of the Double Galaxy. They crash into each other, commencing the birth of a new galaxy.

Cast

Kei Tomiyama as Susumu Kodai
Shuusei Nakamura as Daisuke Shima
Youko Asagami as Yuki Mori
Akira Kamiya as Shiro Kato
Banjou Ginga as Grotas
Ichirô Nagai as Dr. Sakezo Sado
Kazuo Hayashi as Yasuo Nanbu
Keiko Han as Sasha(as the daughter of Mamoru Kodai and Starsha)/Mio Sanada(as the member of the family of Shiro Sanada)
Kenichi Ogata as Analyzer
Masatō Ibu as Heikuro Todo
Michio Hazama as Narrator
Mikio Terashima as Sho Yamazaki
Miyuki Ueda as Starsha
Mugihito as Kazan
Nachi Nozawa as Alphon
Osamu Kobayashi as Osamu Yamanami
Shinji Nomura as Yoshikazu Aihara
Taichirou Hirokawa as Mamoru Kodai
Takeshi Aono as Shiro Sanada
Tohru Furuya as Tasuke Tokugawa
Tōru Ōhira as Skulldart
Yoshito Yasuhara as Kenjiro Ota
Yumi Nakatani as Sada

Production

This movie was intended to be Space Battleship Yamato III.

Reception 
Helen McCarthy in 500 Essential Anime Movies called it a "flawed masterpiece" and stated that "this movie is epic in every way. But its length is a problem - the ending is rushed and there are some plot holes that another half hour or so could have plugged".

Notes

References

External links 
 
 
 

1980 anime films
1980s science fiction action films
Animated films based on animated series
Films directed by Toshio Masuda
Films set in the 23rd century
Japanese animated science fiction films
1980s Japanese-language films
Japanese science fiction action films
Space adventure films
Space Battleship Yamato films